Prognosis is a doctor's prediction about a disease.

Prognosis may also refer to:
Prediction, a statement or claim that a particular event will occur in the future
Prognostics, an engineering discipline focused on predicting the future condition or estimating remaining useful life of a component and/or system of components
Precognition, the claimed psychic ability to perceive information about future places or events before they happen
Fortune-telling, predicting the future, usually of an individual, often commercially
Divination, the alleged practice of ascertaining information from supernatural sources